Formate (IUPAC name: methanoate) is the conjugate base of formic acid.  Formate is an anion or its derivatives such as ester of formic acid.  The salts and esters are generally colorless.

Fundamentals
When dissolved in water, formic acid converts to formate:

Formate is a planar anion.  The two oxygen atoms are equivalent and bear a partial negative charge.  The remaining C-H bond is not acidic.

Biochemistry

Formate is a common C-1 source in living systems.  It is formed from many precursors including choline, serine, and sarcosine.  It provides a C-1 source in the biosynthesis of some nucleic acids. Formate (or formic acid) is ina leaving group in the demethylation of some sterols.. 
These conversions are catalyzed by aromatase enzymes using O2 as the oxidant. Specific conversions include testosterone to estradiol and androstenedione to estrone.  

Formate is reversibly oxidized by the enzyme formate dehydrogenase from Desulfovibrio gigas:

Formate esters
Formate esters have the formula HCOOR (alternative way of writing formula ROC(O)H or RO2CH).  Many form spontaneously when alcohols dissolve in formic acid.  

The most important formate ester is methyl formate, which is produced as an intermediate en route to formic acid.  Methanol and carbon monoxide react in the presence of a strong base, such as sodium methoxide:
CH3OH  +  CO -> HCOOCH3
Hydrolysis of methyl formate gives formic acid and regenerates methanol:
HCOOCH3  ->   HCOOH  +  CH3OH
Formic acid is used for many applications in industry. 

Formate esters often are fragrant or have distinctive odors.  Compared to the more common acetate esters, formate esters are less commonly used commercially because they are less stable.  Ethyl formate is found in some confectionaries.

Formate salts
Formate salts have the formula M(O2CH)(H2O)x.  Such salts are prone to decarboxylation.  For example, hydrated nickel formate decarboxylates at about 200 °C with reduction of the Ni2+ to finely powdered nickel metal:

Such fine powders are useful as hydrogenation catalysts.

Examples

 ethyl formate, CH3CH2(HCOO)
 sodium formate, Na(HCOO)
 potassium formate, K(HCOO)
 caesium formate, Cs(HCOO); see Caesium: Petroleum exploration
 methyl formate, CH3(HCOO)
 methyl chloroformate, CH3OCOCl
 triethyl orthoformate
 trimethyl orthoformate, C4H10O3
 phenyl formate HCOOC6H5
 amyl formate

References

Carboxylate anions
 

de:Formiate